İzmir Women's Museum is a museum in İzmir, Turkey.

The museum building is a three floor-historical building in Tilkilik neighborhood. With a bay window it is a typical İzmir house.  It was opened on 23 January 2014.
During the opening ceremony, Konak mayor Hakan Tartan said that the municipality takes side with women. 

Museum has a total of 13 rooms. In the ground floor, there is a photo of Mustafa Kemal Atatürk, the founder of modern Turkey dancing with his apoted daughter Nebile during the wedding ceremony of the later. Various attire including golden-embroidery bindallı are displayed. A photo timeline of Turkish women, a library and a video room are also in the ground floor. 

The masks of pioneer Turkish women such as Halide Edib Adıvar, Cahide Sonku, Afife Jale, Füreya Koral are displayed in the garden. In the garden, there is also a statue of Nazım Hikmet.  
The upper floor  is reserved for the women's struggles, protest and boycotts with narratation. In the upper floor there is also a collection room with documents and tools both from the Ottoman and the Republican era.

Reference

Konak District
Museums in İzmir
Museums established in 2014
Women's museums in Turkey